Mehdiabad-e Sardar (also Romanized as Mehdīābād-e Sardār and Mehdi Abad Sardar) is a village in Qasemabad Rooral District, in the Central District of Rafsanjan County, Kerman Province, Iran. At the 2006 census, its population was 1,170, in 291 families.

References 

Populated places in Rafsanjan County